Nicentrus is a genus of flower weevils in the beetle family Curculionidae. There are more than 90 described species in Nicentrus.

Species
These 92 species belong to the genus Nicentrus:

 Nicentrus abruptus Casey, 1922
 Nicentrus adspersus Hustache & A., 1938
 Nicentrus alabamae Casey, 1920
 Nicentrus albopictus Hustache & A., 1938
 Nicentrus amazonicus Casey, 1922
 Nicentrus antennalis Hustache, 1950
 Nicentrus australis Casey, 1922
 Nicentrus bifrons Kuschel, 1955
 Nicentrus biplagiatus Hustache & A., 1938
 Nicentrus brasiliensis Hustache, 1950
 Nicentrus candidulus Champion & G.C., 1908
 Nicentrus canus Blatchley, W.S., Leng & C.W., 1916
 Nicentrus chapadanus Casey, 1922
 Nicentrus chihuahuae Casey & T.L., 1920
 Nicentrus chihuhuae Casey, 1920
 Nicentrus circumcinctus Hustache, 1950
 Nicentrus columbicus Hustache, 1950
 Nicentrus contractus Casey, 1892
 Nicentrus convexulus Casey, 1920
 Nicentrus corumbanus Hustache, 1950
 Nicentrus cylindricollis Casey, 1920
 Nicentrus decemnotatus Champion & G.C., 1908
 Nicentrus decipiens (LeConte, 1876)
 Nicentrus densicollis Casey, 1922
 Nicentrus dentirostris Hustache, 1950
 Nicentrus effetus Casey, 1892
 Nicentrus egens Casey, 1922
 Nicentrus egenus Casey & T.L., 1922
 Nicentrus elegans Kuschel, 1983
 Nicentrus episternalis Hustache, 1950
 Nicentrus fallax Hustache, 1939
 Nicentrus falsus Kuschel, 1983
 Nicentrus fasciatus Hustache, 1950
 Nicentrus femoralis Champion & G.C., 1908
 Nicentrus fluminalis Casey, 1922
 Nicentrus forreri Champion & G.C., 1908
 Nicentrus fulvipes Champion & G.C., 1908
 Nicentrus grossulus Casey, 1893
 Nicentrus ingenuus Casey, 1892
 Nicentrus inops Kuschel, 1983
 Nicentrus interruptus Casey, 1922
 Nicentrus jekeli Hustache & A., 1938
 Nicentrus lateralis Casey, 1922
 Nicentrus lecontei Champion, 1908
 Nicentrus lineicollis (Boheman, 1844)
 Nicentrus lobatus Champion & G.C., 1908
 Nicentrus longithorax Hustache, 1950
 Nicentrus luteiventris Kuschel, 1983
 Nicentrus macilentus Champion & G.C., 1908
 Nicentrus medialis Casey, 1922
 Nicentrus montanus Casey, 1920
 Nicentrus napoanus Hustache, 1950
 Nicentrus neglectus Blatchley, 1916
 Nicentrus optivus Kuschel, 1983
 Nicentrus ordinatus Casey, 1920
 Nicentrus ornatus Casey, 1922
 Nicentrus ovulatus Casey, 1920
 Nicentrus parallelus Casey, 1920
 Nicentrus parensis Casey, 1920
 Nicentrus pertenuis Casey, 1920
 Nicentrus piceipes Casey, 1920
 Nicentrus pistorinus Casey, 1920
 Nicentrus placidus Champion & G.C., 1908
 Nicentrus puerilis Champion & G.C., 1908
 Nicentrus puritanus Casey, 1920
 Nicentrus robustus Hustache, 1950
 Nicentrus rubripes Casey, 1920
 Nicentrus saccharinus Marshall, 1952
 Nicentrus scitulus Casey, 1892
 Nicentrus semialbus Hustache, 1950
 Nicentrus serenus Casey, 1922
 Nicentrus signatulus Boheman & C.H., 1844
 Nicentrus silvestris Casey, 1922
 Nicentrus simulans Casey, 1920
 Nicentrus smithi Casey, 1922
 Nicentrus sodalis Casey, 1922
 Nicentrus striatopunctatus Casey, 1920
 Nicentrus subtubalatus Casey
 Nicentrus subtubulatus Casey, 1920
 Nicentrus suffusus Casey, 1922
 Nicentrus suturalis Hustache, 1950
 Nicentrus sylvestris Casey & T.L., 1922
 Nicentrus temerarius Hustache & A., 1938
 Nicentrus testaceipes Champion & G.C., 1908
 Nicentrus texensis Casey, 1920
 Nicentrus townsendi Casey, 1920
 Nicentrus towsendi Casey & T.L., 1920
 Nicentrus trilineatus Casey, 1920
 Nicentrus uniseriatus Casey, 1920
 Nicentrus vacunalis Casey, 1920
 Nicentrus viduatus Hustache, 1950
 Nicentrus wyandottei Blatchley, 1922

References

Further reading

 
 
 

Baridinae
Articles created by Qbugbot